Ryan Fox (born 22 January 1987) is a New Zealand professional golfer who plays on the European Tour and PGA Tour of Australasia.

Professional career
Fox turned professional in 2012 and played on the 2012 PGA Tour of Australasia. He had two 4th-place finishes, in the New Zealand PGA Pro-Am Championship and the New South Wales PGA Championship. He was runner-up in the 2014 Coca-Cola Queensland PGA Championship and later in the year won the Western Australian Open. In early 2015, he had his second win on the PGA Tour of Australasia, the Queensland PGA Championship.

Fox was joint runner-up in the 2015 Maekyung Open in South Korea and later in the year began playing on the 2015 Challenge Tour, winning the Le Vaudreuil Golf Challenge in July. He qualified for the 2015 Open Championship through final qualifying, made the cut and finished tied for 49th place.

Fox played on the 2016 Challenge Tour, winning the Tayto Northern Ireland Open as well as being twice a runner-up, and finished 4th in the Order of Merit, earning his card for the 2017 European Tour.

In 2017, Fox finished 5th in the HNA Open de France and tied 4th in both the Dubai Duty Free Irish Open and the Aberdeen Asset Management Scottish Open. His finish in the Irish Open gained him an entry into the 2017 Open Championship, although he missed the cut. His run of form lifted him in the world top-100 and he received an entry to the 2017 PGA Championship when he finished tied for 54th.

Another timely run of Rolex Series form from late May 2018 resulted in a 43rd in the BMW PGA Championship at the Wentworth Club, an 8th in the Italian Open and subsequent qualification at Walton Heath for the 2018 U.S. Open the following day.

In February 2019, Fox won his first European Tour event, at the co-sanctioned ISPS Handa World Super 6 Perth, beating Adrián Otaegui 3 and 2 in the final. He was the first New Zealander to win on the European Tour in 10 years since Danny Lee.

2022: Second European Tour win and further success
Fox won his second European Tour event in February 2022 at the Ras Al Khaimah Classic. He shot 22-under-par for four rounds, beating Ross Fisher by five shots. In May, Fox finished tied-for-second place at the Soudal Open, two shots behind winner Sam Horsfield. Two weeks later, he was defeated in a playoff by Victor Perez at the Dutch Open. In July, Fox finished runner-up at the Horizon Irish Open, three shots behind Adrian Meronk. In October, he won the Alfred Dunhill Links Championship, shooting a final-round 68 to win by one shot ahead of Alex Norén and Callum Shinkwin. In November, he finished runner-up at the Nedbank Golf Challenge, one shot behind Tommy Fleetwood. Having recorded 10 Top-10s during the 2022 season, Fox found himself lying in second position in the DP World Tour Rankings heading into the final event; the DP World Tour Championship. With a 19th-place finish at the season finale, it was good enough to see Fox maintain his second place in the rankings, finishing only behind Rory McIlroy. With his performances across the 2022 European Tour season, he was awarded with the Seve Ballesteros Award.

Personal life
Fox is the son of former rugby union player Grant Fox, and grandson of cricketer Merv Wallace.

On 9 March 2019, Fox married Anneke Ryff on Rakino Island in the Hauraki Gulf. Their daughter Isabel Marion Fox was born on 18 December 2020.

Professional wins (14)

European Tour wins (3)

1Co-sanctioned by the Asian Tour and the PGA Tour of Australasia

European Tour playoff record (0–2)

PGA Tour of Australasia wins (3)

1Co-sanctioned by the European Tour and the Asian Tour

Challenge Tour wins (2)

Charles Tour wins (3)

Other wins (4)

Results in major championships
Results not in chronological order in 2020.

CUT = missed the half-way cut
"T" = tied for place
NT = No tournament due to COVID-19 pandemic

Results in The Players Championship

"T" indicates a tie for a place

Results in World Golf Championships

1Cancelled due to COVID-19 pandemic

NT = no tournament
"T" = tied

Team appearances
Amateur
Nomura Cup (representing New Zealand): 2009, 2011
Eisenhower Trophy (representing New Zealand): 2010
Sloan Morpeth Trophy (representing New Zealand): 2009, 2010

Professional
World Cup (representing New Zealand): 2016, 2018

See also
2016 Challenge Tour graduates

References

External links

New Zealand male golfers
PGA Tour of Australasia golfers
European Tour golfers
Olympic golfers of New Zealand
Golfers at the 2016 Summer Olympics
Golfers at the 2020 Summer Olympics
Golfers from Auckland
1987 births
Living people